WKDO-FM (98.7 FM) and WKDO (1560 AM) are a pair of radio stations broadcasting a classic country format on FM and a classic hits format on AM, both licensed to Liberty, Kentucky, United States.

Both stations were sold to Creal Broadcasting, Inc. on March 1, 2013, at a price of $300,000. Effective August 18, 2017, Creal Broadcasting sold both stations to Michael and Laura Harris's Shoreline Communications, Inc. for $395,000.

References

External links

KDO-FM
1963 establishments in Kentucky
KDO
Casey County, Kentucky